Scoparia basalis, the many-spotted scoparia moth,  is a moth of the family Crambidae. It is found in North America, including Arkansas, British Columbia, Georgia, Maine, Massachusetts, New Jersey, Oklahoma, Tennessee, Virginia and Washington.

The wingspan is about 13 mm.

References

Moths described in 1866
Scorparia